Samuel Lucius Bestow (March 8, 1823 – January 10, 1907) was an American politician from Iowa. Bestow served in the Iowa State Senate. He was also the first Democrat to serve as the Lieutenant Governor of Iowa from 1892 to 1894 (under Governor Horace Boies, his party colleague).

Notes

Iowa state senators
Lieutenant Governors of Iowa
1823 births
1907 deaths
People from Erie County, New York
People from Lucas County, Iowa
19th-century American politicians